The Mamaroneck Union Free School District is the school district created to serve the public education needs of Larchmont and Mamaroneck, New York.

It serves the Town of Mamaroneck, the Village of Larchmont and the part of the Village of Mamaroneck that is within the Town of Mamaroneck. The part of the Village of Mamaroneck within the Town of Rye is served by the Rye Neck Union Free School District.

The school district comprises four elementary schools serving grades K-5:
 Central School
 Chatsworth Avenue School
 Mamaroneck Avenue School
 Murray Avenue School

There is one middle school serving grades 6-8:
 Hommocks Middle School

And one high school serving grades 9-12:
 Mamaroneck High School

The district offices are in the High School.

References

External links 
 The Mamaroneck Union Free School District website

Mamaroneck, New York
School districts in New York (state)
Education in Westchester County, New York